The protection, preservation, conservation and restoration of industrial heritage, and related machinery is often overlooked in social histories.  As the importance of the industrial heritage of Victoria and Australia has become more prominent, the Melbourne Steam Traction Engine Club was established by volunteers to enable like-minded volunteers to preserve this part of history.  The club was established in Melbourne over 45 years ago and is located at 1200 Ferntree Gully Rd Scoresby, Victoria, Australia. On site there is a collection of Mobile Steam, Stationary Steam Engines, Stationary IC Engines, Diesel engines, Diesel Generator sets, Tractors and other mobile machinery.

History
Formed in 1963, the Melbourne Steam Traction Engine Club has been at its present 6½ hectare site in Scoresby, Victoria since 1986 when it moved from land leased from Beamish Heavy Haulage at Wantirna.  The site was originally a depot used for the tunnelling of the main trunk sewer and was a desolate wasteland when the club took it over. Since occupation, the site has been developed  with landscaping, tree planting, installation of the rail track, construction of the 9 sheds and toilet block and a man-made lake.

National Steam Centre display
The engines on display at the National Steam Centre represent many years of collection and restoration efforts by the members. In addition to the engines owned by the club, a number of members' privately owned engines are kept at the centre. A particular effort has gone in to ensure Australian steam and industrial heritage is preserved for Australians, in Australia, rather than allowing local heritage to be shipped overseas.

Run days
Many of the engines on display are operated on the last Sunday of each month. This opportunity allows visitors to see many of the steam and diesel stationary engines running, including several steam traction engines, steam rollers and tractors operating in the central arena.

Annual rally
The club's annual rally, known as the Scoresby Steamfest is held on the long weekend in March each year when many of the restored engines are exhibited and operated. Particular emphasis is placed on exhibiting engines as they were intended to be used, driving industrial or agricultural implements for example. Exhibits from many other associated clubs and historic machinery associations are also displayed and operated, as well as that from private collectors and enthusiasts. More recently, exhibits at the Scoresby Steamfest have grown to encompass many other hobbies and collections, including model and experimental engineering and crafting, collections of antique engineering artifacts and tools, oil lamps, mechanical music, and other items from bygone eras.

Railway
The miniature railway operates every Sunday, weather permitting, from 11 am to 4 pm, except for the Christmas - New Year period. The track runs for about 1km around the perimeter of the site. On the trip you pass the lake complete with numerous ducks and other water birds, you see the cattle grazing on the nearby farmland and you view some of the museum machinery around the track.

The line is only set up to run a single train at any one time. On the last Sunday of the month the train is pulled by a 4-4-2 steam locomotive if available. On other Sundays the diesel outline engine is used.

The grounds have shady trees, picnic tables and a gas barbecue for a picnic outing. There is no charge for admission to the grounds except for some special events like the annual rally.

See also
 List of steam fairs

External links
 http://www.melbournesteam.com.au

References

Organisations based in Melbourne
Steam festivals
Miniature railways in Australia
Railway museums in Victoria (Australia)
Steam museums
Technology museums in Australia